Makhanda may refer to:
Makhanda (prophet) (died 25 December 1819), Xhosa prophet
Makhanda, South Africa, town formerly named Grahamstown
Makana Local Municipality, local authority governing the town